A partial solar eclipse occurred on July 31, 2000. A solar eclipse occurs when the Moon passes between Earth and the Sun, thereby totally or partly obscuring the image of the Sun for a viewer on Earth. A partial solar eclipse occurs in the polar regions of the Earth when the center of the Moon's shadow misses the Earth.
It was visible from northern Russia, northeastern Scandinavia, northern Greenland, western Canada, and the northwestern United States.

Images

Related eclipses

Eclipses of 2000 
 A total lunar eclipse on January 21.
 A partial solar eclipse on February 5.
 A partial solar eclipse on July 1.
 A total lunar eclipse on July 16.
 A partial solar eclipse on July 31.
 A partial solar eclipse on December 25.

Solar eclipses 1997–2000

Saros 155 series

Metonic series

Notes

References

Partial Solar Eclipse: July 30/31, 2000
www.mreclipse.com Partial Solar Eclipse of 2000 July 30/31 by Fred Espenak (Spokane, WA)
Video of partial solar eclipse in Nizhny Tagil, Russia

2000 7 31
2000 in science
2000 7 31
July 2000 events